Krivec is a surname. Notable people with the surname include:
 Bojan Krivec (born 1987), Slovene basketball player
 Günter Krivec (born 1942), German athlete
 Jana Krivec (born 1980), Slovene chess player

See also
 

Slovene-language surnames